Jessica Loughlin (born 1975) is an Australian glass artist. Her work is included in the permanent collections of the Australian National University, National Gallery of Australia, Wagga Wagga Art Gallery, Corning Museum of Glass, Glasmuseum in Denmark and Museu do Vidro da Marinha Grande in Portugal.

Biography 
Loughlin was born in Melbourne, Australia. She completed a Bachelor of Arts with Honours at Canberra School of Art at the Australian National University in 1997.

References

Australian glass artists
1975 births
Living people
Artists from Melbourne
Australian National University alumni